Mirow is a railway station  in the town of Mirow, Mecklenburg-Vorpommern, Germany.

Train services
The station is served by the following services:

regional service (Hanseatische Eisenbahn) Neustrelitz - Mirow

References

Railway stations in Mecklenburg-Western Pomerania
Railway stations opened in 1890